The National Gymnastics Arena is an indoor arena in Baku, Azerbaijan. The venue is mainly used for gymnastics.

Overview
National Gymnastics Arena in Baku, Azerbaijan was designed by Broadway Malyan. PASHA Construction (PASHA Holding) appointed Broadway Malyan to develop the arena from start to finish after winning a competition to design the scheme in 2011. The construction of the NGA started in August 2009, and was inaugurated in April 2014. The arena has capacity of 5,000–9,000 seats depending on the event conducting.

Airdome
The NGA has an additional training hall - Airdome, which was constructed in the south part of the arena on an area of 6000 m². The dome is kept inflated by ventilators creating internal pressure.

Events
The arena hosted several events of different types of sports as following:

See also
Azerbaijan Gymnastics Federation
Gymnastics in Azerbaijan

References

External links

 

Indoor arenas in Azerbaijan
2015 European Games venues
Sports venues completed in 2014
Sports venues in Baku